James Nagle may refer to:

 James Nagle (general) (1822–1866), officer in the United States Army in the Mexican War and the Civil War
 James L. Nagle (1937–2021), American architect
 James Nagle (hurler) (born 1990), Irish hurler
 James F. Nagle (1927–2019), American politician in the New York State Assembly